Joshua ( Yəhōšūa‘) or Yeshua ( Yēšūaʿ) the High Priest was, according to the Bible, the first person chosen to be the High Priest for the reconstruction of the Jewish Temple after the return of the Jews from the Babylonian Captivity  (See  and  in the Bible).

Life
Joshua son of Jozadak served as High Priest ca. 515–490 BCE in the common List of High Priests of Israel. This dating is based on the period of service at age 25–50 (per Numbers ) rather than age 30–50 (per ).

The biblical text credits Joshua among the leaders that inspired a momentum towards the reconstruction of the temple, in Ezra . Later  some of his sons and nephews are found guilty of intermarriage.

Facts concerning the later part of Joshua's life are in part dependent upon whether Joshua was still alive at the time of his appearance in a vision seen by Zechariah. If the vision relates to Nehemiah's cleansing of the temple in  then the engagement of Joshua's great-great-grandson to the daughter of Sanballat the Horonite would place Joshua in his late 90s if he were still alive.

Appearance in vision
In the Book of Zechariah , Zechariah the prophet experiences a vision given to him by an angel of the Lord in which the restoration and cleansing of Joshua's priestly duties are affirmed.  Included in the visions were requirements in which Joshua was expected to uphold. These included: (1) walk in the ways of God, (2) keeping the requirements (the law), (3) ruling God's house, (4) take charge of my courts; by fulfilling these duties, the angel granted access to the inner temple to Joshua and his fellow priest. The vision also functioned to purify Joshua and to sanctify him for the preparations of his priestly duties.

Alternatively, if Joshua had in fact died before the events of Nehemiah 13, then it is possible that the vision intended to depict a heavenly throneroom scene of Satan and the angel disputing over the soul of Joshua, and the intended target of the allegory is the then serving high priest, his grandson, Eliashib.

Tomb
In 1825, the traditional tomb of Joshua was reported to have been found at "one hour's distance from Baghdad."

Patrilineal ancestry 
As per 1 Chronicles chapter 5

See also
Related Bible parts: Haggai 1, Haggai 2, Zechariah 3

Notes and references

External links
Pictures of tomb of Joshua the High Priest in Iraq, and Courtyard, by Kobi Arami

6th-century BCE High Priests of Israel
5th-century BCE High Priests of Israel
Ezra–Nehemiah
Book of Haggai
Book of Zechariah